State Route 22 (SR-22) is a state highway in southern Utah, running for  in Garfield and Piute Counties from Antimony to Otter Creek Reservoir.

Route description
SR-22 begins in Antimony as a continuation of John's Valley Road and heads generally north through a canyon to Otter Creek Reservoir and Otter Creek State Park, where it ends at an intersection with SR-62.

History
The road from Widtsoe north to Antimony became a state highway in 1914, and in 1915 it was extended west to SR-11 (by 1926 US-89) in Junction. A forest road from Widtsoe south to SR-12 at Tropic Junction was added to the system in 1923, and in 1927 the legislature designated the entire route from Junction to Tropic Junction as SR-22. To improve route continuity on a shortcut between California and Colorado that included the portion of SR-22 between US-89 and SR-62 at Otter Creek Junction, that part was transferred to SR-62 in 1967. (With the completion of I-70 through the San Rafael Swell in 1970, this is no longer a popular route.) The legislature removed John's Valley Road from the state highway system in 1969, turning SR-22 into a short spur from SR-62 to the bridge over Antimony Creek just south of Antimony.

Major intersections

References

022
 022
 022